Samuel Gottlieb von Vogel (14 March 1750, Erfurt, Thuringia – 19 January 1837) was a German physician. He is seen as the founding father of German seaside resorts.

Vogel started studying medical science in Göttingen at the age of 14. In 1771 he attained a doctorate and in 1776 he achieved habilitation. He first started working as a physician in Göttingen, later moving to Ratzeburg. In the meantime he published several medicinal science books.

1789 he became professor of medical faculty at the University of Rostock. In 1793 Friedrich Franz I founded the seaside resort Heiligendamm, upon advice by Dr Vogel.

Literature 
 

1750 births
1837 deaths
Physicians from Erfurt
18th-century German physicians
University of Göttingen alumni
Academic staff of the University of Rostock